Villa Vicentina (locally: La Vila) is a frazione of Fiumicello Villa Vicentina in the Province of Udine in the Italian region Friuli-Venezia Giulia, located about  northwest of Trieste and about  southeast of Udine.

The Villa Ciardi, in the town's territory, was the summer residence of Elisa Bonaparte Baciocchi, sister of Napoleon Bonaparte.

Twin towns
 Colpo, France

References

External links
 Villa Asiola, farm holiday

Cities and towns in Friuli-Venezia Giulia